Locastra bryalis is a species of snout moth in the genus Locastra. It was described by Joseph de Joannis in 1930 and is known from Vietnam.

References

Moths described in 1930
Epipaschiinae